Indian Institute of Technology (BHU) Varanasi (IIT BHU) is a public technical university located in Varanasi, Uttar Pradesh, India. Founded in 1919 as the Banaras Engineering College, it became the Institute of Technology, Banaras Hindu University in 1968. It was later designated an Indian Institute of Technology. IIT (BHU) Varanasi has 16 departments, 3 inter-disciplinary schools and 1 Humanities & Social Sciences Section. It is located inside the Banaras Hindu University Campus.

History
IIT (BHU) Varanasi has formerly been known as the Banaras Engineering College (BENCO), the College of Mining and Metallurgy (MINMET), the College of Technology (TECHNO) and the Institute of Technology, Banaras Hindu University (IT-BHU). Its establishment is intimately linked with that of the Banaras Hindu University (BHU). The first convocation ceremony at BHU was held on 2 December 1920. BHU has the credit of first starting degree classes in Mechanical Engineering, Electrical Engineering, Metallurgy and Pharmaceutics, thanks to the foresight of its founder, Pt. Madan Mohan Malaviya.

The Department of Geology was started under BENCO in 1920. Courses in Mining and Metallurgy were introduced by the Geology Department. The Department of Industrial Chemistry was started in July, 1921. In 1923, Mining and Metallurgy were established as separate departments and in 1944, they were raised to the status of a college forming the College of Mining and Metallurgy (MINMET).

In 1968, BENCO, TECHNO and MINMET were merged and the Institute of Technology (IT-BHU) was established integrating the departments of Mechanical Engineering, Electrical Engineering, Civil and Municipal Engineering, Mining Engineering, Metallurgical Engineering, Chemical Engineering and Technology, Silicate Technology and Pharmaceutics. The Department of Silicate Technology subsequently became the Department of Ceramic Engineering. A Department of Electronics Engineering was also established. The departments of Applied Physics, Applied Mathematics and Applied Chemistry were established in 1985.

The earlier system of regional admission based on merit lists was replaced in 1972 by admission through Indian Institute of Technology Joint Entrance Examination (IIT-JEE) for undergraduate courses and Graduate Aptitude Test in Engineering (GATE) for postgraduate courses. In the tenth meeting of IIT Council in 1972, it was also proposed to convert the then IT-BHU into an IIT and a committee was appointed by IIT Council for the purpose but because of political reasons, the desired conversion could not be achieved then.

In 2003, Committees constituted by MHRD (Professors Joshi and Anand Krishnan Committees) had recommended for the conversion of the Institute into an Indian Institute of Technology (IIT). On 17 July 2008, the government of India issued a press release granting "In principle approval for taking over the Institute of Technology, Banaras Hindu University – a constituent unit of the Banaras Hindu University, a Central University, its conversion into an Indian Institute of Technology and integrating it with the IIT system in the country." The BHU Executive Council approved the proposal of the HRD ministry to convert IT-BHU to IIT (BHU) Varanasi, retaining academic and administrative ties to BHU.

On 4 August 2010 a bill seeking to amend the Institutes of Technology Act 1961 to declare IT-BHU an IIT was introduced in the Lok Sabha by Minister of State for HRD, D. Purandeswari. The Lok Sabha passed The Institutes of Technology (Amendment) Act, 2011 on 24 March 2011 and the Rajya Sabha on 30 April 2012, thereby formalizing the IIT status of the Institute. The Bill was signed by the President of India on 20 June 2012 and notified in the gazette on 21 June.
The Department of Architecture, Planning and Design was set up in the Institute in collaboration with IIT Roorkee, beginning its academic activities from the session 2019-2020. The first cohort of students consisted of 20 students admitted into the five-year programme through the JEE Advanced exam.

The institute celebrated its centenary year in 2019-2020. It organized a global alumni meet and other cultural events during the celebration. The 80-year-old BENCO chimney was also re-erected to commemorate the institute's completion of a century.

Organisation and administration

Departments 
Indian Institute of Technology (BHU) has 11 engineering departments, 3 science departments, 3 schools, and a humanities department:

Academics

Undergraduate programme
IIT (BHU) Varanasi offers four-year instructional programs for the degree of Bachelor of Technology (BTech) and five-year programs for Integrated Dual Degree (IDD). The IDD program offers both BTech and MTech degrees. Admission to all programs is expressly through the Joint Entrance Examination conducted by the Indian Institutes of Technology. Earlier half of the intake for Pharmaceutical sciences was through JEE and the other half through BHU-PMT. But after the college was converted into an IIT, intake for BTech and the IDD in Pharmaceutical sciences (now Pharmaceutical Engineering and Technology) is exclusively through Joint Entrance Exam.

Postgraduate programme 
Postgraduate courses offer Master of Technology (MTech) and PhD degrees. Admissions to the MTech program are made through the Graduate Aptitude Test in Engineering (GATE) conducted jointly by Indian Institute of Science and Indian Institutes of Technology. For admission into the various PhD courses, one can apply through the official institute website. The application brochure is released on the same.

Admission
The admission of students to the institute is through JEE Advanced for undergraduate courses and Graduate Aptitude Test in Engineering (GATE) or Graduate Pharmacy Aptitude Test (GPAT) for postgraduate courses. From 2013, admission to undergraduate programs is based on two tier test called (1) Mains and (2) Advanced. In addition, the students qualifying through JEE (Advanced) need to be in the top 20 percentile of the respective categories and/or have secured 75% or above in the qualifying exam conducted by the boards of their respective state/UT.

Rankings 

Among engineering colleges, IIT (BHU) Varanasi was ranked 13 by the National Institutional Ranking Framework (NIRF) in 2022 and 29 overall.

Library facilities

IIT (BHU) Varanasi has a Main Library and five independent departmental libraries. The main library has a collection of books across streams in engineering, science, and technology, along with a host of books in humanities, social sciences, and literary fiction.

The library has about 1,38,000 volumes of books, journals, theses, reports, and pamphlets. Basic facilities like circulation, scanning, printing, photocopying amenities are also available in this Wi-Fi-enabled library. The library has a sitting capacity of more than 600 students. The faculty and students can have access to these facilities by registering themselves.

The library permits access to nearly 8000 e-journals, 25,000 standards and more than 30,000 electronic books and databases. It has an excellent collection of bound volumes of old (Since 1918) and new periodicals, codes and standards, etc. The library also maintains an online repository containing student thesis and publications, transcripts and event videos, available on the Institute intranet. Apart from this, students also enjoy access to the central and cyber library of Banaras Hindu University.

Student life

Gymkhana
The IIT (BHU) Gymkhana, housed in Kings' Pavilion, is the primary hub of all extracurricular activities in the Institute.

The Gymkhana functions through its five councils:

 Games and Sports Council
 Cultural Council
 Science and Technology Council
 Film and Media Council
 Social Service Council

These councils are headed by their respective Counsellors who work in close coordination with the Dean (Student Affairs). On the student side, each council has a General Secretary and two Joint General Secretaries, with each club being headed by a Secretary and two Joint Secretaries. The councils also organize different festivals in the college annually.

Festivals
IIT BHU has four main student-organised festivals:

 Technex is the annual techno-management festival of IIT BHU and Asia's oldest techno-management fest.

Apart from these, there are several departmental festivals. IIT BHU also participates in Banaras Hindu University's Inter-college festival Spandan which is held annually in the month of February.

Institute Magazine 
The institute newsletter, IIT BHU Connect is a bi-yearly magazine which features in-depth cover stories, recently organized events, adopted proposals, technical advances and helps promote the Institute beyond the boundaries of the university. Having been initiated in the year 2016, six editions have been published so far which received mostly positive reviews. It is run by a student team of around twenty students with one Student Editor.

MCIIE
Malaviya Centre for Innovation, Incubation and Entrepreneurship (MCIIE) was established in 2008. The objective of MCIIE is to produce successful firms that will leave the program financially viable. Incubator tenants not only benefit from business and technical assistance but also from official affiliation with the incubator, a supportive community with an entrepreneurial environment, direct link to entrepreneurs, and immediate networking and commercial opportunities with other tenant firms. The various programmes under MCIIE include:
 Open Learning Programme in Entrepreneurship (OLPE)
 Entrepreneurship Development and Awareness Programs
 Technology Business Incubator (TBI) sponsored by National Science and Technology Entrepreneurship Development Board, DST, New Delhi.

Alumni

IIT (BHU) Varanasi has produced alumni who made a mark for themselves in the fields of technology, business, politics, and arts, among other fields. Alumni interactions are maintained by Student Alumni Interaction Cell (SAIC) under the aegis of the Dean of Resources and Alumni. IIT BHU has multiple alumni organisations including IIT BHU Global Alumni Association (IBGAA) and Association of IITBHU Alumni (AIBA).

Some notable alumni include:
Deepak Ahuja, Former CFO at Tesla, Inc.
Krishan Kant, former Vice-President of India.
Manoj Sinha, 2nd Lieutenant Governor of Jammu and Kashmir and Former Minister of State, Railways and Communication.
Jay Chaudhry, CEO and Founder of ZScaler
Varun Grover (writer), National Film Award-winning Lyricist and Songwriter. Famous for writing the songs of Gangs of Wasseypur.
 Thomas Anantharaman, one of the 3-member team at IBM who developed IBM Deep Blue supercomputer.
Kota Harinarayana, a Padma Shri awardee and distinguished scientist at DRDO
Nikesh Arora, CEO at Palo Alto Networks, Former President at Softbank, Ex-Senior Vice President and Chief Business Officer at Google.
Ram Charan (consultant), renowned management consultant and Economic Times Global Indian of the Year, 2010.
Prateek Maheswari, Co-founder of Physics Wallah (PW)

Alma Communiqé 
The Alma Communiqué is the official alumni newsletter of IIT (BHU), Varanasi prepared by the Office of Dean (Resource and Alumni) and the Student Alumni Interaction Cell (SAIC). It is a monthly newsletter (previously bi-annual), which aims to apprise the alumni of the various happening in IIT (BHU), Varanasi.

IIT (BHU) Chronicle 
The IIT (BHU) Chronicle is a monthly e-magazine published by the IITBHU Global Alumni Association. It was first published in May, 2005. It provides an account of events at the institute as well as notable achievements of members of the alumni community. It also publishes news and articles, sourced from a number of published sources, stating recent developments around the world. The magazine is published around the 25th of each month. It is emailed to over 11,000 alumni, students and faculty of the institute.

See also
Indian Institutes of Technology
List of educational institutions in Varanasi
Banaras Hindu University(B.H.U.)

References

53. NIRF Ranking 2020-Top 10 University list IISc, JNU, and BHU Best Universities

External links

Varanasi, Indian Institute of Technology (BHU)
Banaras Hindu University
Engineering colleges in Uttar Pradesh
Universities and colleges in Varanasi
Educational institutions established in 1919
1919 establishments in India